Copernicia roigii is a palm which is endemic to Cuba.

References

roigii
Trees of Cuba